Rock is the Olympic downhill ski course in China, located in Yanqing District, part of National Alpine Ski Centre resort, opened in 2022. 

The course was designed by Bernhard Russi, assisted by Didier Defago; both are Olympic downhill champions (1972, 2010) from Switzerland. According to Russi, "Rock" is most similar to the "Birds of Prey" course in the United States, located at Beaver Creek, Colorado.

This course has a very unusual terrain configuration, which has no resemblance to any other top level course around the world, as it runs mostly along the top of the ridge and in the canyon in bottom part.

History 
Bernhard Russi, a retired Swiss downhill racer and course architect who planned and constructed six Olympic downhill courses, designed this very steep and unusual course for seven years.

Two years prior to the Olympics, men's World Cup events (downhill, super-G) were scheduled for this course in February 2020, but were cancelled due to the COVID-19 pandemic.

On 7 February 2022, Beat Feuz took the gold medal at downhill, his last missing trophy, at premiere competition on this course. Adrian Smiseth Sejersted set the course top speed record at 139.7 km/h (86.8 mph).

Olympics

Men 

Slalom in men's Alpine combined event was held on "Ice River" course.

Women 

Slalom in women's Alpine combined event was held on "Ice River" course.

World Cup

Men

Profile 
Course is very wavy and curvy in the upper section, very steep in midsection, and gliding part in bottom section. Course has long and fast curves, steep transitions and four big jumps.

Course sections 
Start, High Cloud, Pine Forest, White Face, Galleria, Dwen Dwen jump, Silk Road, Sugar jump, Roller Coaster, Rhon Rhon jump, Haituo Bowl, Canyon, Cliff jump, Finish.

References

External links
 beijing2022.cn official

Sports venues completed in 2021
Venues of the 2022 Winter Olympics
2021 establishments in China
Alpine skiing at the 2022 Winter Olympics
2022
Ski areas and resorts in China